Manya Botez (1896–1971) was a Romanian pianist and children's music teacher.

Background and education 
Manya Botez was born Mania Goldman, of Jewish parents, in Sulina. She studied in Berlin and in Paris, and taught in Berlin until 1939. She founded the "Manya Botez" Music School in Bucharest in 1930, where in 1939 amongst her young pupils was the Romanian composer Aurel Stroe (then aged 7). She returned to Romania at the outbreak of World War II. Later she taught at the Conservatoire de Paris and in London.

Botez was still actively teaching when she died in Richmond, London.

Personal life 
She was the second wife of Romanian writer Eugeniu Botez (known as Jean Bart), whom she married after his first wife, born Marioara Dumitrescu, died in 1913. They had a daughter, Ada Botez, in 1918. In 1926 the marriage ended in divorce, with Ada remaining in the custody of her father. Manya then married General Gheorghe Argeșanu, becoming Manya Botez Argeșanu, but kept her professional name Manya Botez.

Publications 
Manya Botez, Musikalisches A.B.C. "(A Musical A.B.C.)", Romanian children's songs, Bucharest, 1937

Notes

References  
Urmașii lui Jean Bart - Fundația Româna Literară The descendants of Jean Bart - Constantin Mohanu (1933–2006) [Romanian]

1896 births
1971 deaths
People from Sulina
Romanian Jews
Romanian pianists
Romanian women pianists
Women classical pianists
20th-century pianists
Romanian expatriates in France
Romanian expatriates in Germany
20th-century women pianists